The Dubai Hindu Temple is a place of worship for Hindus in Dubai, United Arab Emirates (UAE). The small temple caters to the large Hindu community in the United Arab Emirates.

Services
The temple is only a prayer hall with two altars or shrines ("Sannidhis") on two sides, one for Shiva and one for Krishna. A third altar has been set up for Shirdi Sai Baba also.

The temple is run in conjunction with the Indian consulate in Dubai. Daily worship is performed here for the framed paintings / posters. The temple also performs wedding ceremonies between Hindus.

Description
In 1958, Sheikh Rashid bin Saeed al Maktoum permitted a Hindu temple to be built on the first floor on top of a warren of old-fashioned shops in Bur Dubai. This shopping center is known as the "Bur Dubai Old Souk" and is located west of the Dubai Creek in the area known as Bur Dubai.

This temple, which was permitted to be built in 1958 , is one of the three Hindu temples in UAE. The temple is relatively small compared to diaspora of Indians in UAE. It comprises a medium-sized prayer room located above a warren of old-style shops in the old city area of Dubai, almost an hour drive from the main city. It can be considered more accurately a prayer hall. Most people aren't able to attend prayers on festivals due to room's ability to only hold 10-15 people comfortably at a time.

There used to be a large department store there, built on the upper floor above a set of old-fashioned shops, as department store was shut down, and the area was given for creating a temple. Even today, we find the remains of the department store in the shape of several spiral staircases dotting the prayer hall and taking to lofts (department-store mezzanines) which are used for storage, like in department stores.

Temple Structure
The approach to the temple is through one of the alleys in the shopping center. Underneath the temple hall, there are small old-fashioned shops. This is the shopping center, and there's no particular identifiable gateway.  The alley has shops on both sides, some of which sell the material required for worship, such as flowers and joss-sticks. There are walls built to make the structure sound proof as per government laws to noise control because of structures position in small crowded market.

See also
 Sikhism in the United Arab Emirates

References 

Buildings and structures in Dubai
Hindu temples in the United Arab Emirates
Religious buildings and structures in Dubai